The 1948–49 Kangaroo tour was the seventh Kangaroo tour, in which the Australian national rugby league team travelled to Great Britain and France and played thirty-seven matches, including the Ashes series of three Test matches against Great Britain, an international match against Wales and two Test matches against the French. It followed the tour of 1937-38 and a cessation of overseas international tours due to World War II. The next was staged in 1952-53.

The squad's leadership 
The team was selected with Col Maxwell as captain and Bill Tyquin as vice-captain. Tour co-managers were Bill Buckley and Eric Simmonds.   
Maxwell captained the team on 12 occasions, including the Second Test against Great Britain. 
Tyquin captained the team in 10 matches, including the exhibition match against South Australia and in three Test matches, the two victories over France and the Third Test loss to Great Britain. 
Wally O'Connell captained the Kangaroos in the First Test Match against Great Britain, the international against Wales, and on six other occasions (Salford, Cumberland, St Helens, Bradford Northern, Swindon, and Yorkshire). 
In the matches in which neither Maxwell, Tyquin nor O’Connell played, the Kangaroos were captained by Keith Froome on 3 occasions (Dewsbury, Hull Kingston Rovers, and Lancashire), William Thompson on 3 occasions (Castleford, Languedoc, and Cannes) and Doug McRitchie twice (Hull & Leigh).

Touring squad 
The Rugby League News published a photo and the names and states of the selected players. 
Match details - listing surnames of both teams and the point scorers - were included in E.E. Christensen's Official Rugby League Yearbook, as was a summary of the players' point-scoring. 
Benton, Brosnan, Hall, Horrigan, McMahon, Pegg, Thompson, and Tyquin were selected from Queensland clubs. Dimond, Gibbs, Hawke, and Schubert were selected from clubs in New South Wales Country areas. The balance of the squad had played for Sydney based clubs during the 1948 season.

Note: Tallies in he table above excludes the exhibition match against South Australia. Including the 13 match appearances and 96 points from the South Australia match would alter the leading try-scorer, with Bob Lulham (M 19, T 17, P 51) and Jack Horrigan (M 21, T 17, G 14, P 79) sharing that title with 17 tries each. The tour's leading point-scorer did not play in the South Australia match. 

Adjustments for the other 11 players in the South Australia match would be Henry Benton (M 11, G 1, P 2), Vic Bulgin (M 17, T 2, G 1, FG 1, P 10), Bobby Dimond (M 16, T 14, P 42), Alf Gibbs (M 20, T 4, P 12), Nevyl Hand (M 14, T 5, P 15), Johnny Hawke (M 24, T 12, P 36), Bruce Hopkins (M 14, T 3, G 13, P 35), Doug McRitchie (M 15, T 5, P 15), Noel Mulligan (M 22, T 7, G 1, P 23), Jack Rayner (M 25, T 6, G 1, P 20), and Bill Tyquin (M 15, T 6, G 1, P 20).

Match results 
A scheduled exhibition match in Perth was cancelled when, due to rough seas in the Great Australian Bight, the arrival of the RMS Maloja into Fremantle was delayed. Also due to delays, arrangements were made to fly the players from Marseille into England. This was accomplished in two flights, with one plane flying into Manchester and the other into the outskirts of London.

Exhibition Match

In Great Britain

1st Test vs Great Britain

2nd Test vs Great Britain

Only Test vs Wales

in France

1st Test vs France

2nd Test vs France

3rd Test v Great Britain  
This Test Match was originally intended to be played on December 18, 1948, Due to dense fog at the ground (Odsal) in the hours prior to the match, play was abandoned and the match rescheduled to occur after the French leg of the tour. Curiously, the fog of December 18 cleared around the scheduled time, 2.45pm, of kick-off. The morning of January 29 again saw for at the ground (Odsal), but this cleared by lunch-time and the postponed match was played out under clear skies.

Sources

References

External links 
 1948-49 Kangaroo Tour at Rugby League Project

Australia national rugby league team tours
Rugby league tours of Great Britain
Rugby league tours of France
Kangaroo tour
Kangaroo tour